is a private  women's junior college in Kyoto, Kyoto, Japan, established in 1953.

External links
 Official website 

Japanese junior colleges
Educational institutions established in 1953
Private universities and colleges in Japan
Universities and colleges in Kyoto Prefecture
1953 establishments in Japan